X-Faktor is the Hungarian version of The X Factor, a show originating from the United Kingdom. It is a television music talent show contested by aspiring pop singers drawn from public auditions. The show premiered in 2010 and it continues its success nowadays in the eleventh series.

The original judging panel consisted of Feró Nagy, Miklós Malek, Ildikó Keresztes and Péter Geszti. Róbert Szikora, Gabi Tóth, and Róbert Alföldi joined the judging panel in the Fourth series replacing Nagy, Malek and Ildikó Keresztes, who left the show after the Third series, due to career commitments. In series 5 Little G Weevil took the place of original judge Geszti, who left the show to focus on his music career. In 2015 RTL Klub did not order a new season, instead they aired the first series of Hungary's Got Talent. The show returned in 2016, with new judges ByeAlex, Laci Gáspár and Peti Puskás replacing Alföldi, Szikora and Little G. The show was originally hosted by Balázs Sebestyén and Nóra Ördög. Sebestyén left the show after the First series. Nóra Ördög presented the show in the 2011 and in 2012 In 2013 she was replaced with Lilu and Bence Istenes. In 2014 Lilu left the show Istenes presents the show as a solo host onwards.

There have been eleven winners of the show to date: Csaba Vastag, Tibor Kocsis, Gergő Oláh, Dóra Danics, Andrea Tóth, Barbara Opitz, Ricco & Claudia, USNK, Tibor Ruszó, ALEE and Bernadett Solyom.

Series summary
 "Peter Geszti" category
 "Ildiko Keresztes" category
 "Fero Nagy" category
 "Miklos Malek" category
 "Robert Alföldi" category
 "Robert Szikora" category
 "Gabi Toth" category
 "Gabor Szucs" category
 "ByeAlex" category
 "Laci Gaspar" category
 "Peti Puskas" category
 "Gigi Radics" category
 "Bogi Dallos" category
 "Adél Csobot" category
 "Erika Herceg" category

Notes

  In the Finale of the series 7 the presenter was Bence Istenes.

Judges' categories and their contestants
In each season, each judge is allocated a category to mentor and chooses three acts to progress to the live shows. This table shows, for each season, which category each judge was allocated and which acts he or she put through to the live shows.

 – Winning judge/category. Winners are in bold, eliminated contestants in small font.

Season 1 (2010)

The auditions started in the summer of 2010, with more than 5,000 candidates for the first series in Hungary.

Contestants

The top twelve acts were confirmed as follows:

Key:
 – Winner
 – Runner-up
 – Third place

Season 2 (2011)

The auditions started in the spring of 2011, with thousands of candidates for the second series in Hungary.

Contestants

Key:
 – Winner
 – Runner-up
 – Third place

Season 3 (2012)

The producers' auditions started at the Spring of 2012. Thousands of hopefuls were waiting for their auditions. The judges auditions took place at Budapest on 25–28 June.

Contestants

Key:
 – Winner
 – Runner-up
 – Third place

Season 4 (2013)

On 16 December 2012 the show's host Nóra Ördög announced, that the show will be back for its fourth season in 2013. The apply for the auditions started on the same day.

Three of the original judges left the show after the third series; Miklós Malek, Feró Nagy and Ildikó Keresztes. The original host Nóra Ördög left the show due to her pregnancy.

On 29 April RTL announced the new judges. Péter Geszti is the only original judge, who returned for season 4. The three new judges are: Gabi Tóth, Róbert Szikora and Róbert Alföldi. The RTL announced in May, that two new hosts will present the show in 2013. They are Lilu and Bence Istenes.

Contestants

Key:
 – Winner
 – Runner-up
 – Third place
 – Withdrew

Season 5 (2014)

Péter Geszti, the only original judge left, announced his intention to leave the show after the fourth series to concentrate on his music career. The three other judges returned for a second series alongside new judge Gábor Szűcs.

Original host Nóra Ördög was to return to the show for this series, but she became pregnant. RTL asked Bence Istenes back to host the show for a second run.

Contestants

Key:
 – Winner
 – Runner-Up
 – Third place

Season 6 (2016)

Contestants
Key:
 – Winner
 – Runner-Up
 – Third place

Kristóf Petics had originally been chosen for the live shows, but was disqualified from the competition due to him performing fighting and problematic behavior. He was replaced by Ricsi Mata.

Season 7 (2017)

Contestants
Key:
 – Winner
 – Runner-Up
 – Third place
 – Withdrawn

At the X-Factor press conference on 11 October, Krisztián Nagy announced that he was withdrawing from the competition due to difficulties he was having during the preparation period. He was replaced by Daniel Bereznay.

Season 8 (2018)

Contestants
Key:
 – Winner
 – Runner-Up
 – Third Place
 – Withdrawn

At the X-Factor press conference on 14 November, Krisztián Nagy announced that he was withdrawing from the competition.

Season 9 (2019)

Contestants
Key:
 – Winner
 – Runner-Up
 – Third Place

Series 10 (2021)
On 20 October 2020, RTL Klub announced that they would not return in 2020, due to COVID-19. They stated that the pandemic would not allow them to start the auditions in time. Around the same time it was announced that the show would return in 2021.

Contestants
Key:
 – Winner
 – Runner-Up
 – Third Place

Series 11 (2022)

Contestants
Key:
 – Winner
 – Runner-Up
 – Third Place

Series averages

References

External links
Official website (in Hungarian)

Hungary
Television series by Fremantle (company)
2010 Hungarian television series debuts
Hungarian reality television series
2010s Hungarian television series
Hungarian television series based on British television series
RTL (Hungarian TV channel) original programming